Muniguda, located 60 km from Rayagada, is a town in the Rayagada district in the Indian state of Odisha

Muniguda was once rich with natural greenery, hills and peaceful tribal people. The population of Muniguda is approximately sixty-six thousand as per census India report 2011.

Major industry

Cotton is grown in this area and is a major industry that supports its population.  In January 2007, there was unrest in the area regarding the cotton industry and its sales.  This prompted the government to create Cotfed, The Odisha Cotton Growers' Co-operative Federation. 
and here mainly peoples depends on cultivation and paddy is major part of cultivation and other seasonal goods like jhudunga, black gram (udad), hill gram (arhar), nigerseeds, tillyseeds, gurjee, jawar, maize, musterseed, turmeric and many more with forest base products also procure in a huge quantity. It is also a major market hub of Rayagada District. 
 
Vedanta Alumina Ltd., is the recent major industrial project nearby Muniguda catering to all the latest developments in commercial domain.

Health Care Services
"Govt Community Health Center, Muniguda" (Muniguda Hospital) is the main instant medical service available in the heart of the city.
Currently it is assisted by an "108 Emergency service" to improve the health care system.

Ramakrishna Mission Charitable Dispensary. Situated on the campus of Ramakrishna Mission, Hatamuniguda. Doctor's consultation and medicines are provided to the patients free of cost.  On an average 18,000 patients are treated in a year.

Transportation
This town is well connected through road & rail and is a commercial hub for this area. All the nearby small towns & villages rely on Muniguda for trading.

Road Link

SH5 and SH6 are the state highway passes through the town. It has one bus station named as Muniguda Bus Station). Bus service both private and government are used to connect with city like Bhawanipatna, Rayagada, Phulbani, Berhampur, Bhubaneswar, Vishakhapatnam, Chandarpur, Gunupur, Paralakhemundi  etc.

Rail Link

Muniguda Railway Station is the one and only railway station serving the city having India railway code "MNGD". Muniguda is accessible by train from Bhubaneshwar, Visakhapatnam, Raipur, Sambalpur, Berhampur, Rourkela, Kolkata (Calcutta), Delhi, Chennai (Madras), Hyderabad, Tirupati, Mumbai, Ahmedabad, Bangalore, Howrah and Jaipur

Air Link (Nearest 3 airports)

1. Visakhapatnam - Distance 240 km

2. Raipur  - Distance 290 km

3. Bhubaneswar - Distance 382 km

Education

Banking Service

Ashrama
Ramakrishna Mission Ashrama
a branch centre of internationally reputed Religious and Charitable Organisation, Ramakrishna Mission with its headquarters at Belur Math, Howrah, West Bengal, India.

References

Cities and towns in Rayagada district